Typisk norsk (Typical Norwegian) is a news and magazine program about language and communication produced by Dropout Productions (seasons 1 and 2) and Rubicon TV (season 3) for NRK. Three seasons of the program were produced (2004, 2005, and 2006). The concept is inspired by the Swedish SVT-produced series Värsta språket ('The Worst Language') with Fredrik Lindström as the host.

Petter Schjerven is the host of Typisk norsk. Among other things, the program covers interesting topics in language and communication. It also deals with language enthusiasts and researchers and discusses problems with the Norwegian language.

The first season had 453,000 viewers, the second season 553,000, and the third 622,000.

Typisk norsk won the Gullruten award in 2005 for Best culture or magazine program and Best male host. In 2006, the editors of the program received .

Typisk norsk has covered, among other things:
 Word separation and hyphenation
 Slang
 How Norwegian sounds to immigrants
 Dialects
 Norwegian in comparison to Danish and Swedish
 Old Norse
 Where language ability comes from
 The guttural R sound
 The Norwegian method of counting
 Odd translations in films

Kjell

In 2005, Typisk norsk’s Petter Schjerven presented the new letter kjell on the program, a letter to prevent the kj sound from being replaced by sj and disappearing from the language.

The letter kjell was proposed as a new letter of the Norwegian alphabet in 2005.

The voiceless palatal fricative is unstable in many Norwegian dialects, and is disappearing from the speech of young people; younger speakers in Bergen, Stavanger and Oslo even merge  into the voiceless retroflex sibilant .

The proposal for the new letter was created by design agency SDG and presented by Petter Schjerven in the television program  ('Typically Norwegian').

References

External links
 Typisk norsk's official page (with episodes on Nett-TV)

Norwegian language
Norwegian television news shows
NRK original programming
Spelling reform